Ri Yong-jik (李榮直, Ri Ei Nao, born 8 February 1991), also known as Lee Yong-jick, is a North Korean international football player who plays for Iwate Grulla Morioka.

Career
On 7 January 2020, Ri joined to J2 club, FC Ryukyu ahead of 2020 J2 League season.

On 28 December 2022, Ri joined to J3 relegated club, Iwate Grulla Morioka for upcoming 2023 season.

International career
Ri received a red card in a game against Saudi Arabia national football team.

International goals
Scores and results list North Korea's goal tally first.

Career statistics

Club
Updated to the start of 2023 season.

References

External links

Profile at Kamatamare Sanuki 
Profile at V-Varen Nagasaki 

1991 births
Living people
Osaka University of Commerce alumni
Association football people from Osaka Prefecture
North Korean footballers
North Korea international footballers
Japanese footballers
North Korean expatriates in Japan
J1 League players
J2 League players
J3 League players
Tokushima Vortis players
V-Varen Nagasaki players
Kamatamare Sanuki players
Tokyo Verdy players
FC Ryukyu players
Iwate Grulla Morioka players
Asian Games medalists in football
Footballers at the 2014 Asian Games
2015 AFC Asian Cup players
2019 AFC Asian Cup players
Association football midfielders
Zainichi Korean people
Asian Games silver medalists for North Korea
Medalists at the 2014 Asian Games